Khan Abad is a town and the district center of Khan Abad District, Kunduz Province, Afghanistan. It is situated in the valley of the Khanabad River east of Kunduz. On 22 August 2016, Afghan security forces retake the town from Taliban after losing it for 2 days.

Populated places in Kunduz Province